is a sub-kilometer asteroid, classified as near-Earth object of the Amor group orbiting between Earth and Mars. It was first observed by the Lincoln Near-Earth Asteroid Research (LINEAR) at the Lincoln Laboratory ETS on 20 September 2003.

 was being considered by the European Space Agency as a candidate target for the Don Quijote mission to study the effects of impacting a spacecraft into an asteroid.

Orbit and classification 

 is an Amor asteroid – a subgroup of near-Earth asteroids that approach the orbit of Earth from beyond, but do not cross it. It orbits the Sun at a distance of 1.0–1.2 AU once every 14 months (436 days; semi-major axis of 1.13 AU). Its orbit has an eccentricity of 0.08 and an inclination of 3° with respect to the ecliptic.

The body's observation arc begins with its first observation by LINEAR in 2003.

Numbering and naming 

As of 2020, this minor planet has neither been numbered nor named.

Physical characteristics 

The object's spectral type remains unknown.

Diameter and albedo 

Using a magnitude-to-diameter conversion,  measures 86 and 160 meters in diameter, based on an absolute magnitude of 22.7 and an assumed albedo of 0.20 (S-type) and 0.057 (C-type), respectively.

References

External links 
 ESA Don Quijote mission
 
 

612600
612600
20030920